Benamahoma (Arabic “Sons of Muhammad”), one of the White Towns of Andalusia, is a town of some 400 inhabitants in Cádiz province, Spain.  It is located 5 km from El Bosque, Cádiz, and lies within the Sierra de Grazalema Natural Park.

Culture 
It is well known for its festival of Moros y Cristianos (Moors and Christians), which is celebrated in the first week of August in honor of Saint Anthony of Padua, patron saint of the town.

Nature 

It contains the Fuente de Nacimiento or Manantial de El Nacimiento, a natural spring that gives rise to the river Majaceite.

External links 
Grazalema - Información turística, senderos,fauna y flora (en Ingles)
Grazalema - Information turística de Grazalema y la Sierra de Grazalema

Municipalities of the Province of Cádiz